The Equipment of the Indonesian Navy can be subdivided into: vessels, aircraft, munitions, small arms, vehicles, and attire. These also includes the equipment of the Marine Corps, KOPASKA and Denjaka special forces.

Ships

All commissioned ships of the TNI-AL have the prefix KRI, standing for Kapal Republik Indonesia (Republic of Indonesia Ship). Smaller boats which have a length less than 36m and made from fiberglass have the prefix KAL, standing for Kapal Angkatan Laut (Navy ships).

Combat Ships 
Combat Ships includes ships from the "Eskorta", Submarines, and Fast Ships Units.

Patrol Ships 
Patrol Ships includes ships from the Patrol Unit, and smaller KAL Ships.

For a detailed list: Indonesian Navy Patrol ships

Support Ships 
Support Ships includes ships from the Mine, Support, and Amphibious Unit.

Aircraft

Munitions

Land vehicles

Small arms

See also
List of equipment of the Indonesian Army
List of equipment of the Indonesian Air Force
List of equipment of the Indonesian National Police
List of aircraft of the Indonesian National Armed Forces

References

Indonesian Navy
Indonesian Navy
Military equipment of Indonesia